Tudeley is a village in the Tunbridge Wells borough of Kent, England.

The village is home to All Saints' Church, the only church in the world that has all its windows in stained glass designed by Marc Chagall. The East window was commissioned by Sir Henry and Lady D'Avigdor-Goldsmid in memory of their daughter Sarah, who died aged 21 in a boating accident in 1963. The other windows were added later, the final ones being installed in 1985, the year of Chagall's death. Today the church also hosts the Tudeley Festival, an Early Music event which has been running since 1985.

Somerhill House, which houses The Schools at Somerhill, lies within the bounds of Tudeley.

Nature
Tudeley Woods is owned by the Hadlow Estate and managed in partnership with the RSPB. It comprises restored ancient wood and heathland, which have been connected through extensive coppicing to open up the woodland floor and allow the woodland flowers and butterflies to flourish. The result is that there more than 1,000 species of fungi in the woods, with orchids intermingled with carpets of bluebells and primroses in spring. The coppicing allows for charcoal burning, with the products sold locally. Free to access, car parking is restricted, whilst dogs on leads are allowed on the public footpaths and bridleways.

Future
The Tunbridge Wells Borough draft local plan published in August 2019, suggests a new town of 2,800 dwellings replacing the village and destroying 600 acres of green belt land  including ancient woodland and the habitat of three European protected species.  Despite vocal local concern over the destruction of green belt and agricultural land and serious transport issues  the borough council have decided to press on with their plan.

Images

References

External links

Hadlow Estate
All Saints' Church, Tudeley
RSPB Tudeley Woods
Tudeley Festival
Save Capel campaign group
Capel History Group

Villages in Kent